The Secretary of State for Relations with the Cortes and Constitutional Affairs (SERCAC) is a high-ranking official within the Government of Spain in charge of the relations between the executive and the legislative branches. The SERC is a political appointment made by the Monarch with the advice of the minister in charge of the ministerial department.

This position is normally integrated in the Ministry of the Presidency although in some periods it had its own department. The Secretary of State represents the Government in all the bodies of the Cortes Generales which the Government consider important to go; is in charge for all the relations between the executive branch and both Congress and Senate with the exception of draft bills, Royal decree-laws or Royal legislative decrees whose negotiation and follow-up directly falls to the minister responsible.

It is also in charge of following the activity of the Parliament, advising the government members how to act before Parliament and make legal reports about constitutional amendments or other issues of high relevance. The Secretary of State for Relations with the Cortes is assisted by two departments, the Directorate-General for Relations with the Cortes and the Directorate-General for Constitutional Affairs and Legal Coordination.

History
The raison d'être of this Secretariat of State was the need of establishing proper relations between the Government and the Cortes Generales, because the Constitution established a parliamentary system in which the Government is accountable to the Parliament, unlike the dictatorship period when the legislative power was a mere facade and was subordinated to the executive branch.

For these reasons, in 1977 the position of the Deputy Minister for Relations with the Cortes was created. This minister had under its authority a Secretary-General for Relations with the Cortes, a Parliamentary Secretary for Relations with Congress and Senate and a Secretary for Relations with the Public Administration. This Secretary-General assumed most of the powers of the current official, so it can be considered the direct precursor of the Secretariat of State.

This Secretariat of State was organized through two departments: one in charge of the legislative activity and other in charge of the government accountability to parliament.

Since its creation, the Secretary of State has undergone enormous modifications, being even elevated to rank of Ministry between 1986 and 1993. Between 2009 and 2011, its name changed to Secretary of State for Constitutional and Parliamentary Affairs.

Another relevant change happened in 2020 when it was renamed Secretary of State for Relations with the Cortes and Constitutional Affairs. This change of name did not mean an extension of powers, but only that its responsibilities were divided between the already existing Directorate-General for Relations with the Cortes and the new  Directorate-General for Constitutional Affairs and Legal Coordination.

Structure
The Secretariat of State, which the Secretary of State leds, is structured as follows:
 The Directorate-General for Relations with the Cortes.
 The Deputy Directorate-General for Legislative Coordination.
 The Deputy Directorate-General for Parliamentary Initiatives.
 The Deputy Directorate-General for Written Control.
 The Deputy Directorate-General for Parliamentary Documentation.
 The Directorate-General for Constitutional Affairs and Legal Coordination.
 The Deputy Directorate-General for Constitutional Regime.
 The Cabinet of the Secretary of State for Relations with the Cortes.
 The Chief of Staff.
 Three Advisors.

List of Secretaries of State
 Gabriel Cisneros (1981–1982)
 Virgilio Zapatero (1982–1986)
 Enrique Guerrero Salom (1993–1996)
 José María Michavila Núñez (1996–2000)
 Jorge Fernández Díaz (2000–2004)
 Francisco Caamaño Domínguez (2004–2009)
 José Luis de Francisco Herrero (2009–2011)
 José Luis Ayllón Manso (2011–2018)
Rubén Moreno Palanques (February–June 2018)
 José Antonio Montilla Martos (2018–2021)
Rafael Simancas (2021–present)

References

Secretaries of State of Spain